Megan Joan Fleming (born 1984), is an Australian/New Zealand poet, non-fiction writer and academic.

Biography 
Fleming grew up in Sydney, Australia, until employment opportunities spurred the family to relocate first to Bermuda, then Golden, Colorado, before finally settling in Auckland, New Zealand. She studied creative writing at the International Institute of Modern Letters at Victoria University, where she won the Biggs Poetry Prize in 2007. She graduated from the University of Otago with a Master of Arts with a thesis on the iterative poetry of Anne Carson. She holds a PhD in ethnopoetics from Monash University, Melbourne, a city in which she now lives.  

Fleming's grandparents were stationed as Baptist missionaries in the town of Yuendumu, in the Northern Territory of Australia. As a result, she has an ongoing interest in Warlpiri culture, with much of her poetry and non-fiction work focusing on themes of cultural misunderstandings, the limits of language, and the continuing effects of colonialism. More recent work also explores such themes as eco-feminism and ecological collapse.

She has published a number of collections of poetry, as well as writing and co-editing works of literary criticism, essays, short stories and book reviews for publications in Australia, New Zealand and overseas.

Awards and honours 
Fleming's honours include the Biggs Poetry Prize, the Verge Prize for Poetry and the Harri Jones Memorial Prize from the Hunter Writers Centre in 2017. In 2021, she was shortlisted for the Helen Anne Bell Poetry Bequest award for her unpublished manuscript Dirt.

Publications 
 Poetry

 Song of Less (Cordite, 2021)
 Some People’s Favourites (Desperate Literature, 2019)
 Failed Love Poems (Victoria UP, 2015)
 The Same As Yes (Victoria UP, 2011)
 Two Dreams in Which Things Are Taken (Duets, 2010)

 Non-Fiction

 Dressing for the Apocalypse (Island, 2021)
 Pulling Up the Walls (Verge, Monash UP, 2021)
 Write First, Apologise Later? (Pantograph Punch, 2020)
 Notes Toward a Theory of Making (Westerly 64.1, 2019)
 Kardiya as Kindergartner: The Poetics of Ignorance in the Central Desert (Meanjin 78.1, 2019)
 Seated between the eyes of two worlds: the Intercultural work of Craig San Roque (Philosophy Activism Nature 13, 2018)
 The limits of knowledge: A reflexive reading of Warlpiri poetics (JEASA 9.1, 2018)
 On Misunderstanding, Masquerade, and the Prose Poem (Bonsai: Best Small Stories from Aotearoa New Zealand)

 Editor

 Verge 2015 (Monash UP, 2015)

References 

Monash University alumni
1984 births
Living people

Poets from Sydney
21st-century Australian poets
21st-century Australian women writers
Australian women poets
International Institute of Modern Letters alumni
University of Otago alumni